The Grammy Award for Best American Roots Performance is an award category at the annual Grammy Awards. It was first presented in 2015.

The award was first approved by the board of trustees of the Grammy Awards in June 2014. According to NARAS, the award encompasses all of the subgenres of the American Roots category field, which include Americana, bluegrass, blues, folk and other forms of regional roots music. The category is open for solo artists, duos, groups and other collaborations and is for singles or tracks only. It was joined by a sister category, Best Americana Performance, in 2023.

The Grammy is awarded to the performer(s) of the winning recording.

Recipients

Artists with multiple nominations

3 nominations
 Blind Boys of Alabama
 Brandi Carlile

2 nominations
 Rhiannon Giddens
 Sarah Jarosz
 Alison Krauss
 Mavis Staples

References and links

2015 establishments in the United States
Awards established in 2015
Grammy Award categories